The 1985–86 United Counties League season was the 79th in the history of the United Counties League, a football competition in England.

Premier Division

The Premier Division featured 20 clubs which competed in the division last season, along with one new club:
Northampton Spencer, promoted from Division One

League table

Division One

Division One featured 15 clubs which competed in the division last season, along with five new clubs:
Baker Perkins, joined from the Peterborough and District League
Cogenhoe United, joined from the Northamptonshire Combination
Ramsey Town, joined from the Peterborough and District League
St Ives Town, joined from the Peterborough and District League
Wellingborough Whitworth, joined from the East Midlands Alliance

League table

References

External links
 United Counties League

1985–86 in English football leagues
United Counties League seasons